The U.S. Post Office-Lindsborg is a Classical Revival building at 125 East Lincoln Street in Lindsborg, Kansas. The post office building was constructed in 1938 and added to the National Historic Register in 1989.

A depression-era WPA mural titled Smoky River by Swedish-born painter Birger Sandzen is in the lobby. The artist was paid $390 for the mural. Federally commissioned murals were produced from 1934 to 1943 in the United States through the Section of Painting and Sculpture, later called the Section of Fine Arts, of the Treasury Department.

See also 
List of United States post offices

References 

Government buildings completed in 1938
Post office buildings on the National Register of Historic Places in Kansas
Buildings and structures in McPherson County, Kansas
Lindsborg, Kansas
National Register of Historic Places in McPherson County, Kansas